Constantin Cantacuzino may refer to:

Constantin Cantacuzino (stolnic) (1639–1716), Wallachian stolnic, historian and diplomat
Constantin Cantacuzino (died 1877), Wallachian kaymakam in 1848
Constantin Cantacuzino (aviator) (1905–1958), Romanian World War II flying ace

See also
 Cantacuzino family